The Pelentong River is a river in Johor Bahru District, Johor, Malaysia.

See also
 List of rivers of Malaysia

References

Johor Bahru District
Rivers of Johor